The Hawaii Territorial Legislature was established on April 30, 1900, by the Hawaiian Organic Act which established the Territory of Hawaii as part of the United States. It was the legislative body of the Territory until Hawaii became a state in 1959.

Establishment 
The Hawaii Territorial Legislature was established on April 30, 1900, by the Hawaiian Organic Act which annexed the Republic of Hawaii into the United States and established it as the Territory of Hawaii. All laws created by the Republic of Hawaii were retained, except for those "inconsistent with the Constitution or laws of the United States" or with the provisions of the Organic Act; various laws of the Republic of Hawaii were explicitly repealed in the text of the Organic Act.

Makeup and operation 
The Hawaii Territorial Legislature was a bicameral body comprising a Senate and a House of Representatives. Positions in both chambers were elected. Each had the power to select its own officers and design its procedural rules. A quorum was defined as the majority of the members of a given chamber, and a vote by a quorum was sufficient for "the conduct of ordinary business", but a simple majority was required for the passage of laws.

Legislative sessions were required to be held in odd-numbered years, and could be held in even-numbered years at the discretion of the legislature. Those held in even-numbered years, called "budget sessions", were restricted to matters related to the budget, elections, and impeachment of officials. Sessions began on the third Wednesday in February.

The Hawaii Territorial Legislature convened at ʻIolani Palace.

Senate 
The Senate of the Territory of Hawaii had 25 members (15 members until February 18, 1959), elected for four-year terms. Members, required to be United States citizens who were older than 30, eligible to vote, and had lived in Hawaii for three years, were initially elected from six senatorial districts:

 First district: Puna, Hilo and Hamakua (5 senators)
 Second district: Kau, Kona and Kohala (2 senators)
 Third district: Maui, Molokai, Lanai and Kahoolawe (5 senators)
 Fourth district: "That portion of the island of Oahu lying east and south of Nuuanu Street and Pali Road and the upper ridge of the Koolau Range from the Nuuanu Pali to Makapuu Point and all other islands not specifically enumerated" (5 senators)
 Fifth district: The portion of Oahu lying outside the fourth district (5 senators)
 A sixth district consisting of Kauai and Niihau was established in 1956. (3 senators)

House of Representatives 
The House of Representatives of the Territory of Hawaii had 51 members (30 members until February 18, 1959), elected to two-year terms. There were eighteen representative districts, which were each entitled to elect somewhere from one to six representatives. Representatives were required to be United States citizens who were older than 25, eligible to vote, and had lived in Hawaii for three years.

Disestablishment 
The Hawaii Territorial Legislature adjourned for the final time on May 2, 1959, when Hawaii became a state and the Hawaii State Legislature therefore became its legislative body.

References

Citations

Works cited 

1900 establishments in Hawaii
1959 disestablishments in Hawaii
Government of Hawaii
Hawaii Legislature
Defunct bicameral legislatures
Former territorial legislatures of the United States